Frank Hill Smith (1842–1904) was an American artist and interior designer based in Boston, Massachusetts. He painted landscapes and figures; and designed wall frescos, stage curtains, stained-glass windows, and other décor. Among his works are ceiling frescoes in the Representatives Hall in the Massachusetts State House.

Life and career

In Boston Smith trained with Hammatt Billings (c. 1859) and also studied at the Lowell Institute. As part of his training he "drew from the antique at the Athenaeum." He travelled in Europe in the 1860s, studying at "the atelier Suisse, in Paris, and ... with [Léon] Bonnat and other noted French painters" (1865).

In the 1870s "there is no doubt that Smith, [Albion Harris] Bicknell, [Thomas] Robinson, Cole, [William Morris] Hunt, Waterman, and, later on, [Frederic Porter] Vinton, and one or two others, had pretty much the swing of art in Boston for several years. ... They were constantly together, working like brothers in the cause. ... Smith, Robinson, and Hunt used to paint a great deal together; in fact, they formed a triumvirate club to 'sass one another's pictures,' as Hunt termed it."

In 1880 New York's "Union League Club ... contracted with John La Farge, Frank Hill Smith, Augustus Saint-Gaudens, and Will H. Low to undertake decoration of ... areas in [its] new building." In 1886 Smith was "working on the plans of a Casino, to be erected in Green Bay, Florida. The designs are drawn in a broad, artistic manner, and are the most extensive for comfort and elegance of any known in this country. It is estimated that it will require $350,000 to erect and finish the structure."

Around this time he designed a cottage intended for Walt Whitman; it was never built. He painted an "elegant drop curtain" for the Fairhaven Town Hall auditorium, in Massachusetts, c. 1894. Smith also painted ceiling frescoes in the Representatives Hall in the Massachusetts State House, depicting portraits of Samuel Adams, John Hancock, James Otis and Joseph Warren.

In Boston's Beacon Hill, he lived in the Sunflower House on the corner of River and Mt. Vernon Streets. A local newspaper described it:
One of the things to see here is the house of Mr. Frank Hill Smith, the artist. He has transformed an old wooden building at the corner of Mt. Vernon and River Streets into the most attractive and picturesque place in the city. ... The upper story and roof are tiled, the windows are abundant and pretty; on the front of the large gable in the roof is a huge sunflower in high relief; below it, on the upper story, is a winged lion in relief; over the front door is a course of grotesque, open carving; the whole is painted yellow, and is so attractive that people who love light and sunshine hover about it like moths round a candle. There is nothing in New England in the least like it; and Mr. Fields did it no more than justice when he brought it into his lecture on Cheerfulness, a day or two ago, with a hearty compliment to its originality, and its cheering influence.

Smith exhibited works in the Museum of Fine Arts in Copley Square (1877) and Williams & Everett's gallery (c. 1877). He belonged to Boston's St. Botolph Club. He also acted as a judge in the 1876 U.S. Centennial Exhibition in Philadelphia. Around the 1880s he served on the "Permanent Committee of the School of Drawing and Painting of the Museum of Fine Arts," Boston.

Smith died at Boston in 1904.

His descendants included artist Fannie Hillsmith.

Gallery
Paintings by F.H. Smith

Designs by Smith

 Young's Hotel, Boston
 Union League Club of New York Club-House interior, c. 1881 (5th Ave. and 39th St.)
 House, Falmouth, Massachusetts, c. 1886
 Casino, Green Bay, Florida, 1886
 Cafe, Dunderberg Mount, New York, c. 1890
 Massachusetts State House Representatives Hall frescoes, Boston, 1894
 Holyoke Opera House, Holyoke, Massachusetts
 Cottage intended for Walt Whitman (not built)
 Union Club, Chicago
 Christ Church, Cambridge, Massachusetts
 Puritan steamer ship, Old Colony Steamboat Co.

References

Further reading
 Fay, John William; Linen, Herbert M.; Dearborn, L.E. The Cyclopædia of American Biography, Volume 5. 1915.
 Champlin, John Denison and Perkins, Charles Callahan. Cyclopædia of painters and paintings, Volume 4. Charles Scribner's Sons, 1913.
 Fenno-Gendrot. Artists I Have Known. Boston: Warren Press, March 1923.
 Fielding, Mantle. Mantle Fielding's Dictionary of American Painters, Sculptors & Engravers. New York: J.F. Carr, 1965.
 Robinson, Frank Torrey. Living New England Artists: Biographical sketches, reproductions of original drawings and paintings by each artist. Boston: S. E. Cassino, 1888.
 Waters, Clara Erskine and Hutton, Laurence. Artists of the 19th Century and Their Works: A handbook containing two thousand and fifty biographical sketches. Volume 2. Boston: Houghton, Osgood, 1879.

External links

 Google news archive. Articles related to F. Hill Smith

1842 births
1904 deaths
Artists from Boston
19th century in Boston
American interior designers
People from Beacon Hill, Boston